Qasemabad (also Romanized as Qāsemābād) is a village in Qazvineh Rural District, in the Central District of Kangavar County, Kermanshah Province, Iran. At the 2006 census, its population was 86, in 26 families.

References 

Populated places in Kangavar County